The 32nd International 500-Mile Sweepstakes was held at the Indianapolis Motor Speedway on Monday, May 31, 1948.

For the second year in a row, the Blue Crown Spark Plug teammates Mauri Rose and Bill Holland finished 1st-2nd. Rose became the second driver to win the Indianapolis 500 in consecutive years. Unlike the previous year's race, no controversy surrounds the results. Coupled with his co-victory in 1941, Rose became the third three-time winner at Indy. 

Fourth place finisher Ted Horn completed a noteworthy record of nine consecutive races from 1936 to 1948 completing 1,799 out of a possible 1,800 laps. His nine consecutive finishes of 4th or better (however, with no victories) is the best such streak in Indy history. The only lap he missed in 1940 was due to being flagged for a rain shower.

Duke Nalon's third-place finish would be the best-ever result for the popular Novi engine.

Results

Alternates
First alternate: Johnny Shackleford  (#48)

Failed to Qualify

Walt Ader  (#15, #45)
Manny Ayulo  (#88)
Henry Banks (#38)
Cliff Bergere (#12, #85)
Walt Brown (#69)
Jim Brubaker  (#14)
Red Byron  (#43)
Bob Droeger  (#44)
Louis Durant (#29)
Milt Fankhouser (#23)
Myron Fohr  (#32)
Ken Fowler (#41)
Roland Free (#73)
Andy Granatelli  (#39, #59)
Art Hartsfeld  (#27)
Ralph Hepburn (#12) - Fatal accident
Jackie Holmes  (#24, #93)
Ronney Householder (#68)
George Lynch  (#56)
George Metzler  (#47)
Al Miller (#66)
Cowboy O'Rourke  (#45)
Johnnie Parsons  (#39)
Joe Perkins  (#62)
Ralph Pratt (#87)
Charlie Rogers  (#89)
Pete Romcevich (#49)
Loral Tansy  (#71)
Joel Thorne (#57)
Louis Tomei (#10)
Eddie Zalucki  (#21)

Broadcasting

Radio
The race was carried live on the Mutual Broadcasting System, the precursor to the IMS Radio Network. The broadcast was sponsored by Perfect Circle Piston Rings and Bill Slater served as the anchor. The broadcast feature live coverage of the start, the finish, and live updates throughout the race.

Sid Collins, from WIBC, joined the crew for the first time, serving as a turn reporter at the south end of the track.

Gallery

See also
 1948 AAA Championship Car season

Notes

Works cited

References

Indianapolis 500 races
Indianapolis 500
Indianapolis 500
1948 in American motorsport